John Normington (28 January 1937 – 26 July 2007) was an English actor primarily known for his work on television. Normington was also a member of the Royal Shakespeare Company performing in more than 20 RSC productions. He performed widely in the West End and at the National Theatre.

Early life
Normington was born 28 January 1937 in Dukinfield, Cheshire, in 1937, where he resided in Montrose Avenue with his parents and two younger sisters, Judith and Joan. He originally attended Victoria Road Infants School, before transferring to Globe Lane County Primary, then went to Crescent Road Boys School. He trained as an opera singer at the Northern School of Music. Following this, he did his national service, and while stationed in Aldershot joined Farnham rep. Normington joined the Repertory Theatre in Oldham in 1950, and from 1959 to 1962 he worked at the Library Theatre in Manchester. After a short spell at the Oxford Playhouse, he joined the Royal Shakespeare Company in 1963 and played many Shakespearean roles. He continued on stage for the rest of his life, with many memorable roles.

Acting career
In 1963, he made his first appearance on television. In the 1960s and 1970s, he appeared in programmes such as Murder Most English; The Caesars; Softly, Softly; Nearest and Dearest; Public Eye; The Edwardians; Crown Court; Upstairs, Downstairs (in the episode "Such A Lovely Man"), and ITV Playhouse. His film credits included roles in Inadmissible Evidence (1968), A Midsummer Night's Dream (1968), The Reckoning (1969), Stardust (1974), Rollerball (1975), The Medusa Touch (1978), The Thirty Nine Steps (1978), A Private Function (1984), Hitler's S.S.: Portrait in Evil (1985) as Himmler, My Family and Other Animals (1987), Jack the Ripper (1988) and Wilt (1989).

During the 1980s, he appeared in Play for Today; Yes, Prime Minister (in the episode "One of Us"); Inspector Morse; and Agatha Christie's Poirot. Normington played Morgus in the 1984 Doctor Who serial The Caves of Androzani and Trevor Sigma in the 1988 serial The Happiness Patrol. The following decade, Normington played roles in programmes such as The New Statesman; Peak Practice; Hetty Wainthropp Investigates; Coronation Street; The Bill, and David Copperfield. In 2001 Normington appeared in Love in a Cold Climate.

Later life
In 2004, Normington appeared in King Lear in Stratford. Before the production moved to the West End, he had to withdraw after developing pancreatic cancer. He recovered to an extent that he took on further roles on stage and screen. On stage he appeared in The Voysey Inheritance in 2006 and The Entertainer from March to April 2007, before he pulled out due to ill health. On screen, he appeared in the 2004 Midsomer Murders episode; "Bad Tidings"; the Torchwood episode "Ghost Machine"; Trial & Retribution XIV, and Casualty in 2007—his final TV appearance. Normington died of pancreatic cancer on 26 July 2007 in the Chelsea and Westminster Hospital, London aged 70. His partner was John Anderson.

Filmography

References

External links

List of Royal Shakespeare Company performances

1937 births
2007 deaths
Deaths from cancer in England
Deaths from pancreatic cancer
English male film actors
English male Shakespearean actors
English male stage actors
English male television actors
English gay actors
People from Dukinfield
Male actors from Cheshire
Royal Shakespeare Company members